Abdallah al-Hubal (1955 – August 16, 1998) was a Yemeni serial killer.

After killing seven people in 1990 after the Yemeni reunion, he was imprisoned in Aden, but was able to flee for a short time. He was not found until the beginning of August 1998, when he killed a couple and three other people in Bayt al-Faqīh. The latter were, according to the police, witnesses of the first two murders. On August 16, 1998, al-Hubal engaged in a firefight with the police killing one policeman and injuring several others before being shot himself.

See also 
 List of serial killers by country
 List of serial killers by number of victims

Literature 

 Murakami, Peter and Julia: Lexikon der Serienmörder 450 Fallstudien einer pathologischen Tötungsart. 7. Auflage, Ullstein Taschenbuch, München 2001, .

References 

1955 births
1998 deaths
1998 murders in Asia
1990 murders in Asia
Male serial killers
Murder in Yemen
People shot dead by law enforcement officers
Yemeni serial killers